Les Escoumins may refer to:

Les Escoumins, Quebec
Les Escoumins, Quebec (Indian reserve), also known as Essipit, Quebec

See also
Petits-Escoumins, Quebec